St. Mary Lake is a lake located on Vancouver Island south of Cameron Lake.

References

Alberni Valley
Lakes of Vancouver Island
Alberni Land District